Phylomictis palaeomorpha is a moth in the family Depressariidae. It was described by Alfred Jefferis Turner in 1898. It is found in Australia, where it has been recorded from Queensland.

References

Moths described in 1898
Phylomictis